The Birds, the Bees & the Monkees is the fifth studio album by the Monkees. Released in April 1968, it was the first Monkees album not to reach Billboards number one, peaking at No. 3 on the U.S. charts. It was also their first album to miss the UK charts altogether, with their four previous efforts all having reached the top ten. The album has sold over a million copies.

History
While 1968 presented several misfortunes for the band (their eponymous television series was canceled; their first motion picture project, Head, failed at the box office; their television special, 33⅓ Revolutions per Monkee, arguably fared even worse; and, in December, Peter Tork left the group), The Birds, The Bees & The Monkees proved to be another successful album, yielding the group's sixth million-selling single in "Valleri" and yet another No. 1 in "Daydream Believer", written by former Kingston Trio member John Stewart. "Tapioca Tundra", an experimental piece of poetry put to music by Nesmith, charted well as the B-side to "Valleri" and reached No. 34.

After gaining complete artistic control over their musical direction and being allowed to play instruments on their own records in early 1967, the success of Headquarters and Pisces, Aquarius, Capricorn & Jones Ltd. began to somewhat rebuff the critics who viewed The Monkees as a band of talentless individuals who were simply lucky enough to gain recognition through their "manufactured" origins.

After the Pisces album, however, the desire and focus to remain as a complete band unit in the studio evaporated, and each individual band member began to produce his own sessions with his own selected studio musicians, often at entirely different studios around the Los Angeles area. According to Chip Douglas, "Peter kind of drifted away first, and then everybody did. Everyone wanted to do their own songs and produce them the way they wanted to hear them."  An agreement was made to label all finished efforts as "Produced by The Monkees" but, in reality, beyond a few exceptions the recordings featured on The Birds, The Bees & The Monkees reverted to the recording process of the first two albums (fewer group dynamics), except now each band member was fully in charge of the sessions. Chip Douglas, producer of the Monkees' previous two albums, fully expected to continue as the band's representative in the studio, but found the individual Monkees more interested in exploring their diverse musical backgrounds with their own friends and associates rather than relying on Douglas as the central figure. Douglas continues, "I was ready to do that Boyce & Hart song 'P.O. Box 9847' – it sort of had that 'Paperback Writer' feel on the demo. We passed on it for Pisces, and I began to think, 'Well, we should do that one now.' Then somebody said, 'Chip, we're not working with you anymore; we're gonna do our own thing.'"

While being credited as the producers, in reality the Monkees were assisted in the studio by Colgems' president, and head of Screen Gems-Columbia Publishing, Lester Sill, jazz musician and arranger Shorty Rogers, or future manager and later MCA vice president Brendan Cahill. "At that point their contract read that they were to be credited as producers on any product of theirs that came out", Rogers recalls. "Brendan Cahill and I really did all the studio work and production with Lester Sill. When we finished the album, Lester said, 'We'll put you down as producers', but The Monkees didn't want it, so that went by the wayside."

Davy Jones' Broadway rock, Michael Nesmith's country and western leanings and psychedelic experiments, and the rock and soul of Micky Dolenz made for a diverse album. Several of Peter Tork's compositions were considered for release on Birds; however, they were all rejected (for reasons unknown). Aside from playing piano on "Daydream Believer", he did not participate in the making of the record at all. Veteran Monkees tunesmiths Boyce and Hart returned to the fold to contribute the psychedelic "P.O. Box 9847", as well as a new version of "Valleri."

The rare U.S. mono album (COM-109) was released in a limited quantity, as mono albums were being phased out by 1968, and has become a highly sought item for its unique mixes that differ from the common stereo versions. Mono copies from Australia, India, Israel, Mexico and Puerto Rico are known to have the same mix as the U.S. There may be others as well. Most countries' mono versions — including the UK's — feature a "fold-down" mix where the stereo channels are reduced to one monaural channel (a mono version of the stereo mix).

Artwork

The front cover of the album shows a shadow box that contains some memorabilia from the 1940s through 1960s, including a Cootie bug, a popgun, a fan that folds out into a paper flower, ceramic birds, various paper flowers and stick flowers (which were popular in 1968). Alan Wolsky, whose agency created the cover, put a picture of himself in the bottom center square, partially obscured by some flowers. The rear cover  contains the term "MIJACOGEO" alongside Micky's photo, a term that is an acronym for the members of Micky's family (Micky, Janelle, Coco and George, respectively). Another quirk was that while Davy and Peter signed autographs in a traditional manner on their rear cover photos, Michael Nesmith signed "Carlisle Wheeling" to be superimposed onto his picture. This was the title of a song that did not make it on to any Monkees release at that time. However, it appeared on his post-Monkees album Loose Salute with the First National Band, having been renamed "Conversations". The song also was later released on various Monkees rarities collections.

Reissue

On February 8, 2010, Rhino Records' Rhino Handmade released a three-CD boxed set reissue of the album. It was made available only online directly from Rhino. The set is housed in a 7 inch by 7 inch box with a 3D lenticular cover. It contains the original stereo and U.S. mono versions of the album in miniature vinyl replica sleeves, over 60 demos, rehearsals and outtakes from the original album's sessions, a commemorative pin and a booklet of essays and session information by Monkees historian Andrew Sandoval. The first 1,000 orders include a bonus vinyl single featuring two more unreleased tracks, acoustic versions of "St. Matthew" and "Lady's Baby".

The mono mix was re-released in October 2014 by Friday Music, as part of The Monkees in Mono box set. This pressing features messages in the dead wax reading "Thanks to the Monkees" and "In memory of Davy Jones" on sides 1 and 2, respectively.

Track listing

Original 1968 Colgems vinyl issue

Side 1

Side 2

Aborted track listing

The original track lineup for the album, compiled in March 1968, included the following songs:

Side 1

 "Through The Looking Glass"
 "We Were Made For Each Other"
 "Writing Wrongs"
 "I'll Be Back Up On My Feet"
 "Valleri"
 "Long Title: Do I Have To Do This All Over Again"

Side 2

 "Dream World"
 "P.O. Box 9847"
 "Tapioca Tundra"
 "The Poster"
 "Alvin"
 "Daydream Believer"
 "Zor and Zam"

1994 Rhino CD reissue

Tracks 1-12: Original album in stereo

1996 Sundazed vinyl reissue

2010 Rhino Handmade deluxe CD reissue

Disc 1 (The Original Stereo Album & More)

Tracks 1-12: Original album in stereo

"Through the Looking Glass" (1968 Stereo Mix) (Red Baldwin, Boyce, Hart) - 2:49 
"Long Title: Do I Have to Do This All Over Again" (Alternate Mix) (Tork) - 2:36 
"D.W. Washburn" (1968 Stereo Mix) (Jerry Leiber, Mike Stoller) - 2:50 
"It's Nice to Be with You" (1968 Stereo Mix) (Jerry Goldstein) - 2:52 
"Carlisle Wheeling" (1967 Stereo Mix) (Nesmith) - 3:07 
"Rosemarie" (1968 Stereo Mix) (Dolenz) - 2:38 
"My Share of the Sidewalk" (1968 Stereo Mix) (Nesmith) - 3:01 
"Alvin" (Alternate Take) (Thorkelson, Thorkelson) - 0:22 
"We Were Made for Each Other" (Alternate Backing Track) (Bayer, Fischoff) - 2:46 
"The Girl I Left Behind Me" (1967 Stereo Mix) (Bayer, Sedaka) - 4:32 
"Little Red Rider" (Acoustic Version) (Nesmith) - 2:30 
"Lady's Baby" (1968 Stereo Mix) (Tork) - 2:25 
"Ceiling in My Room" (1967 Stereo Mix) (Dominick DeMieri, Bobby Dick, Jones) - 3:50 
"I'm a Man" (Backing Track) (Barry Mann, Cynthia Weil) - 2:55 
"Me Without You" (1968 Stereo Mix) (Boyce, Hart) - 2:16 
 
Disc 2 (The Original Mono Album & More)

Tracks 1-12: Original album in mono

"Alvin" (1968 Mono Mix) (Thorkelson, Thorkelson) - 0:24 
"While I Cry" (1968 Mono Mix) (Nesmith) - 3:02 
"D.W. Washburn" (Mono Single Mix) (Leiber, Stoller) - 2:49 
"It's Nice to Be with You" (Mono Single Mix) (Goldstein) - 2:53 
"Come on in" (1968 Mono Mix) (Mapes) - 3:19 
"Carlisle Wheeling" (1968 Mono Mix) (Nesmith) - 3:02 
"Rosemarie" (1968 Mono Mix) (Dolenz) - 2:39 
"The Girl I Left Behind Me" (1967 Mono Mix) (Bayer, Sedaka) - 2:45 
"Seeger's Theme" (Alternate Version) (Seeger) - 0:42 
"Tear the Top Right Off My Head" (Micky's Vocal) (Tork) - 1:55 
"My Share of the Sidewalk" (1968 Mono Mix) (Nesmith) - 3:02 
"Lady's Baby" (1968 Mono Mix) (Tork) - 2:26 
"Ceiling in My Room" (1967 Mono Mix) (DeMieri, Dick, Jones) - 3:15 
"Merry Go Round" (1968 Mono Mix) (Tork, Diane Hildebrand) - 1:43 
"Don't Listen to Linda" (1968 Mono Mix) (Boyce, Hart) - 2:56 
"Me Without You" (1968 Mono Mix) (Boyce, Hart) - 2:17 
"Zor and Zam" (TV Version) (Chadwick, Chadwick) - 2:04 
The Birds the Bees & the Monkees Teen Radio Spot - 1:00 
 
Disc 3 (The Birds, The Bees & The Raritees)

Monkees Adult Stereo 8 Spot - 0:59 
"Tear the Top Right Off My Head" (Peter's Vocal) (Tork) - 1:57 
"Auntie's Municipal Court" (Mike's Vocal) (Nesmith, Allison) - 4:08 
"P.O. Box 9847" (1968 Alternate Stereo Mix) (Boyce, Hart) - 3:22 
"War Games" (Version One) (Jones, Pitts) - 2:12 
"Lady's Baby" (Tork) - 2:27 
"Tapioca Tundra" (1967 Alternate Stereo Mix) (Nesmith) - 3:02 
"D.W. Washburn" (Alternate Mix with Bass Vocal) (Leiber, Stoller) - 2:56 
"Nine Times Blue" (Version Two - Davy's Vocal) (Nesmith) - 2:19 
"Lady's Baby" (Acoustic Version) (Tork) - 2:19 
"While I Cry" (Alternate Mono Mix) (Nesmith) - 3:05 
"Shorty Blackwell" (Rehearsal) (Dolenz) - 2:54 
"Laurel and Hardy" (Berry, Christian) - 2:45 
"Seeger's Theme" (Acoustic Version) (Seeger) - 0:52 
"Tapioca Tundra" (Acoustic Version) (Nesmith) - 3:15 
"Don't Say Nothin' Bad" (About My Baby) (Goffin, King) - 2:08 
"War Games" (Version Two) (Jones, Pitts) - 2:31 
"(I Prithee) - Do Not Ask for Love" (Second Recorded Version) (Michael Martin Murphey) - 3:47 
"My Share of the Sidewalk" (Mike's Vocal Version) (Nesmith) - 3:12 
"Shake 'em Up and Let 'em Roll" (Alternate Vocal Version) (Leiber, Stoller) - 2:10 
"Changes" (2009 Mix) (Jones, Pitts) - 2:25 
"Merry Go Round" (Version One) (Tork, Hildebrand) - 1:29 
"Magnolia Simms" (Acoustic Version) (Nesmith) - 3:15 
"I'm Gonna Try" (Jones, Pitts) - 2:44 
"Seeger's Theme" (Electric Version) (Seeger) - 0:42 
"Magnolia Simms" (Stereo Remix) (Nesmith) - 3:42 
"The Girl I Left Behind Me" (Third Recorded Version) (Bayer, Sedaka) - 2:57 
"Merry Go Round" (Third Recorded Version) (Tork, Hildebrand) - 1:41 
"Nine Times Blue" (Version Two - Mike's Vocal) (Nesmith) - 2:17 
"The Party" (2009 Mix) (Jones, Pitts) - 3:01 
"I Wasn't Born to Follow" (Backing Track) (Goffin, King) - 2:58

Vinyl 45

"St. Matthew" (Acoustic Version) (Nesmith)
"Lady's Baby" (Alternate Acoustic Version) (Tork)

Session information
All tracks produced by The Monkees unless otherwise specified.

Dream World
Written by David Jones and Steve Pitts
Lead vocal: Davy Jones
Guitar: Michael Deasy, Al Hendrickson, Gerry McGee
Harpsichord: Don Randi
Bass: Max Bennett
Drums: Earl Palmer
Percussion: Brendan Cahill, Teresa Helfer, Milt Holland, Jerry Williams
Violin: Sam Freed, Nathan Kaproff, George Kast, Martin Limonick, Alexander Murray, Erno Neufeld
Cello: Marie Feram, Edgar Lustgarten, Jacquelyn Lustgarten, Fredrick Seykora
Trumpet: Buddy Childers, Jack Sheldon
Trombone: George Roberts
French Horn: John Cave, Don Duke, Arthur Maebe
Arrangement: Shorty Rogers
Recorded at Western Recorders Studio 2, Hollywood, California; February 6, 1968 and RCA Victor Studios, Hollywood, California; February 8, 1968

Auntie's Municipal Court
Written by Keith Allison and Michael Nesmith
Lead vocal: Micky Dolenz
Harmony vocal/percussion: Michael Nesmith
Backing vocals: Michael Nesmith, Bill Chadwick, and Unknown
Electric guitar: Michael Nesmith, Keith Allison, Bill Chadwick
Bass: Richard Dey
Drums: Eddie Hoh
Recorded at RCA Victor Studios, Hollywood, California; January 6, 15–16, 1968
Mono mix features louder guitar accompaniment

We Were Made for Each Other
Written by Carole Bayer Sager and George Fischoff
Lead vocal: Davy Jones
Guitar: James Burton, Michael Deasy, Al Hendrickson, Gerry McGee
Harpsichord: Michael Melvoin
Bass: Max Bennett
Drums: Earl Palmer
Percussion: Brendan Cahill, Milt Holland, Jerry Williams
Mallet: Milt Holland
Violin: Sam Freed, Nathan Kaproff, George Kast, Marvin Limonick, Alexander Murray, Erno Neufeld
Cello: Maria Fera, Jacquelyn Lustgarten, Kurt Reher, Eleanor Slatkin
Trumpet: Buddy Childers, Jack Sheldon
Trombone: Lewis McCreary
French horn: Vincent DeRosa, David Duke, Richard Preissi
Arrangement: Shorty Rogers
Originally intended for Pisces, Aquarius, Capricorn & Jones Ltd.
Recorded at Western Recorders Studio 2, Hollywood, California; February 6, 1968 and RCA Victor Studios, Hollywood, California; February 7 and 9, 1968

Tapioca Tundra
Written by Michael Nesmith
Lead vocal/whistle/electric and acoustic guitars/percussion: Michael Nesmith
Bass: unknown
Drums: Eddie Hoh
Recorded at RCA Victor Studios, Hollywood, California; November 11, 18–19, 1967

Daydream Believer
Written by John Stewart
Lead/backing vocals: Davy Jones
Harmony vocal: Micky Dolenz
Electric guitar: Michael Nesmith
Piano: Peter Tork
Producer/bass/percussion: Chip Douglas
Bell: Bill Martin
Drums: Eddie Hoh
Violin: Nathan Kaproff, George Kast, Alex Murray, Erno Neufeld
Trumpet: Pete Candoli, Al Porcino, Manuel Stevens
Piccolo trumpet: Manuel Stevens
Trombone: Richard Noel
Bass trombone: Richard Leith, Philip Teele
Arrangement: Shorty Rogers
Recorded at RCA Victor Studio A, Hollywood, California; June 14, 1967 and RCA Victor's Nashville Sound studio, Nashville, Tennessee, August 9, 1967
Issued as a single on Colgems #1012, 25 October 1967, No. 1
Only song on Birds featuring all members of the band, and the only song featuring Tork at all.
Replaced "Love is Only Sleeping" as a single.
Used in Monkees episodes "Art, For Monkees' Sake", "Monkees Marooned", "A Coffin Too Frequent", "Hitting the High Seas".

Writing Wrongs
Written by Michael Nesmith
Lead vocal/electric guitar/organ/piano: Michael Nesmith
Bass: Richard Dey
Drums/percussion: Eddie Hoh
Recorded at RCA Victor Studios, Hollywood, California; December 3, 1967
Final product is two takes spliced together

I'll Be Back Up On My Feet
Written by Sandy Linzer and Denny Randell
Lead/backing vocals: Micky Dolenz
Guitar: Al Casey, Michael Deasy, Dennis Budimir
Harpsichord: Michael Melvoin
Bass: Max Bennett
Drums: Earl Palmer
Percussion: Brendan Cahill
Tambourine: Milt Holland, Stan Levey
Quica: Milt Holland, Stan Levey
Saxophone: William Hood
Trumpet: Buddy Childers, Oliver Mitchell
Trombone: Louis Blackburn, Lew McCreary
Arrangement: Shorty Rogers
Recorded at RCA Victor Studios, Hollywood, California; March 9 and 14, 1968
Intended for More of The Monkees, then again for Pisces, Aquarius, Capricorn & Jones Ltd.
Original version featured in The Monkees episodes "Dance Monkee, Dance" and "Monkees in the Ring".

The Poster
Written by David Jones and Steve Pitts
Lead/backing vocals: Davy Jones
Guitars: Al Casey, Michael Deasy, Howard Roberts
Organ: Don Randi
Bass: Max Bennett, Lyle Ritz
Drums: Hal Blaine
Glockenspiel/percussion/tambourine: Gary Coleman, Gene Estes
Trumpet: Buddy Childers, Clyde Reasinger, Jack Sheldon, Anthony Terran
Trombone: Milt Bernhart, Richard Leith, Lew McCreary, Frank Rosolino
Saxophone: John Lowe
Woodwind: John Lowe
Violin: Nathan Kaproff, George Kast, Marvin Limonick, Alex Murray, Erno Neufeld, Ambrose Russo
Arrangement: Shorty Rogers
Recorded at RCA Victor Studios, Hollywood, California; February 15 and 17, 1968

P.O. Box 9847
Written by Tommy Boyce and Bobby Hart
Lead vocal: Micky Dolenz
Backing vocal: Probably Coco Dolenz, Micky Dolenz
Electric guitars: Gerry McGee, Louie Shelton
Bass: Joe Osborn
Tack piano: Bobby Hart
Drums/percussion: Billy Lewis
Violin: Victor Arno, Jack Pepper
Viola: Philip Goldberg
Cello: Raymond Kelley
Marxophone/tabla: unknown
Arrangement: Don McGinnis
Inspired by an idea by Bob Rafelson
Although credited to The Monkees, the song was produced by Tommy Boyce and Bobby Hart
Recorded at United Recorders, Hollywood, California; December 26, 1967; February 10, 1968

Magnolia Simms
Written by Michael Nesmith
Lead vocal/guitar: Michael Nesmith
Tack piano: Paul T. Smith
Bass: Max Bennett
Drums: Earl Palmer
Trumpet: Oliver Mitchell
Trombone: Lew McCreary
Woodwinds: Jim Horn, Jack Nimitz
Recorded at RCA Victor Studios, Hollywood, California; December 2, 1967
Recorded as a low-fi song with deliberate surface noise and skipping as if it came from a 78 RPM record. On the stereo mix, this track is heard only on the left channel.

Valleri
Written by Tommy Boyce and Bobby Hart
Lead vocal: Davy Jones
Backing vocal: unknown
Electric guitars: Gerry McGee, Louie Shelton
Bass: Joe Osborn
Drums: Billy Lewis
Tambourine: Billy Lewis
Saxophones: Jim Horn, Jay Migliori
Trumpets: Oliver Mitchell, Roy Caton
Trombone: Lew McCreary
Arrangement: Don McGinnis
Although credited to The Monkees, the song was produced by Tommy Boyce and Bobby Hart
Recorded at United Recorders, Hollywood, California; December 26 and 28, 1967
Issued as a single as Colgems #1019, February 17, 1968, reaching number three.
Colgems chief Lester Sill added brass section to mix after rejecting initial mix
This mix was used for the episode "Monkee's Blow Their Minds" with the fade-out dropped (a factor which would later be used on compilations).
Featured in The Monkees episode "The Monkees Blow Their Minds"; original version featured in "Captain Crocodile" and "Monkees in Manhattan"

Zor and Zam
Written by Bill Chadwick and John Chadwick
Lead vocal: Micky Dolenz
Electric guitars: Keith Allison, Bill Chadwick
Bass: Chip Douglas, Richard Dey, Max Bennett
Piano: Michael Melvoin
Drums: Hal Blaine, Eddie Hoh, Milt Holland, Stan Levey
Percussion: Micky Dolenz, Hal Blaine, Milt Holland, Stan Levey, Henry Diltz
Gong: Hal Blaine, Milt Holland, Stan Levey
Timpani: Hal Blaine, Milt Holland, Stan Levey
Trombone: Milt Bernhart, Richard Leith, Lew McCreary, Frank Rosolino
Trumpet: Buddy Childers, Clyde Reasinger, Jack Sheldon, Anthony Terran
Violin: Nathan Kaproff, George Kast, Marvin Limonick, Alex Murray, Erno Neufeld, Ambrose Russo
Saxophone/woodwind: John Lowe
Arrangement: Shorty Rogers
Alternate early version featured in The Monkees final episode "The Frodis Caper"
Recorded at RCA Victor Studios, Hollywood, California; January 7, 13, 18 and February 14, 17, 1968

1994 bonus tracks session Information
Alvin
Written by Nicholas Thorkelson
Spoken words: Peter Tork
Recorded at Western Recorders, Hollywood, California; January 20, 1968

I'm Gonna Try
Written by David Jones and Steve Pitts
Lead vocal: Davy Jones
Guitar: Al Casey, Mike Deasey, Howard Roberts
Bass: Lyle Ritz
Drums: Hal Blaine
Harpsichord: Don Randi
Marimba/tambourine: Gary Coleman, Gene Estes
Trombone: Milt Bernhart, Richard Leith, Lew McCreary, Frank Rosolino
Trumpet: Buddy Childers, and Clyde Reasinger, Jack Sheldon, Anthony Terran
Saxophone: John Lowe
Woodwind: John Lowe
Violin: Nathan Kaproff, George Kast, Marvin Limonick, Alex Murray, Erno Neufeld, Ambrose Russo
Recorded at RCA Victor Studios, Hollywood, California; February 15 and 17, 1968
Originally considered for  Changes
Similar music track to Jones/Pitts song "Party", recording during same session

P.O. Box 9847 (early mix)
Moog Synthesizer: Micky Dolenz
Earlier mix features moog synthesizer instead of string section
Recorded at United Recorders, Hollywood, California; December 26, 1967

The Girl I Left Behind Me (second recorded version)
Written by Carole Bayer Sager and Neil Sedaka
Lead vocal: Davy Jones
Other personnel unknown
Recorded at RCA Victor Studios, Hollywood, California; October 31 and November 7 and 21, 1967

Lady's Baby (alternate mix)
Written and produced by Peter Tork
Lead vocal/guitar: Peter Tork
Backing vocal: Karen Harvey Hammer
Electric guitar: Stephen Stills
Bass: Lance Wakely
Drums: Dewey Martin
Sound effects: Justin Hammer
Recorded at RCA Victor Studios, December 1, 17, 21, 1967, and January 14, 19, 24, 1968; Western Recorders, Hollywood, California; February 2 and 7, 1968
Constant production changes and re-recordings resulted in song not being finished in time for release

2010 bonus tracks session information
D. W. Washburn (1968 stereo mix)
Written by Jerry Leiber and Mike Stoller
Lead vocal: Micky Dolenz
Backing vocal: Unknown
Guitar: Keith Allison, Bill Chadwick
Banjo: Henry Diltz
Bass: Chip Douglas
Drums: Jim Gordon
Tack Piano: Michel Rubini
Glockenspiel: Larry Bunker
Saxophone: Bill Hood
Trumpets: Carroll Lewis, Williamson
Trombone: Lou Blackburn, Herbie Harper
Recorded at RCA Victor Studios, Hollywood, California; February 17 and March 1, 1968

It's Nice To Be with You (1968 stereo mix)
Written by Jerry Goldstein
Lead vocal: Davy Jones
Guitars: James Burton, Mike Deasy, Al Hendrickson, Gerry McGee
Bass: Max Bennett
Drums: Earl Palmer
Keyboard: Michael Melvoin
Violins: Sam Freed, Nathan Kaproff, George Kast, Marvin Limonick, Alex Murray, Erno Neufeld
Cellos: Marie Fera, Jacqueline Lustgarten, Kurt Reher, Eleanor Slatkin
Saxophone: Bill Hood
Trumpets: Buddy Childers, Oliver Mitchell
French horn: Vincent DeRosa, David Duke, Dick Perissi
Trombones: Lou Blackburn, Lew McCreary, Jack Sheldon
Recorded at Western Recorders, Studio 2, February 6, and RCA Victor Studios, Hollywood, California; February 7, 1968

Ceiling in My Room (1967 stereo mix)
Written by Dominick DeMieri, Robert Dick and David Jones
Lead/backing vocals: Davy Jones
Guitars: Dom DeMieri, Eddie Placidi
Bass: Robert Dick
Drums: Kim Capli
Piano: Charlie Smalls
Recorded on November 14, 1967

Auntie's Municipal Court (alternate mix)
Lead/harmony vocals: Michael Nesmith
Additional harmony vocals: Micky Dolenz
Co-lead vocals: Micky Dolenz
Alternate mix featuring Nesmith on lead vocals with extra sound effects during final instrumental, although Dolenz still appears as the lead vocalist briefly during a couple of segments in the final verses at 2:45 and 3:16

Other personnel
Produced by The Monkees (except "Daydream Believer" produced by Chip Douglas)
Recording engineers: Pete Abbot, Hank Cicalo
Music supervision: Lester Sill
Original cover design: Allan Wolsky and friends

Charts

Album

Singles

Certifications

References

External links
The Birds, The Bees & The Monkees 3-CD box set by Rhino

The Monkees albums
1968 albums
Arista Records albums
RCA Records albums
Rhino Records albums
Sundazed Records albums
Colgems Records albums
Albums recorded at United Western Recorders